Treasure Island is an 1883 novel by Robert Louis Stevenson.

Treasure Island may also refer to:

Film and television
 Treasure Island (1918 film), a film by Chester and Sidney Franklin
 Treasure Island (1920 film), a film featuring Shirley Mason
 Treasure Island (1934 film), a film starring Jackie Cooper and Wallace Beery
 Treasure Island (1938 film), a Soviet film by Vladimir Vaynshtok
 Treasure Island (1950 film), a Disney film starring Bobby Driscoll and Robert Newton
 Treasure Island (1966 miniseries), a German miniseries by Wolfgang Liebeneiner
 Treasure Island (1972 live-action film), a film starring Orson Welles
 Treasure Island (1973 film), a film released by Filmation
Treasure Island (1977 TV series), a British adaptation
Treasure Island (1978 TV series), a Japanese anime television series, known as Takarajima in Japanese
 Treasure Island (1982 film), a Soviet film
 Treasure Island (1985 film), a Chilean-French film
 Treasure Island (1988 film), a Soviet animated musical film released by Kievnauchfilm
 Treasure Island (1990 film), a film starring Christian Bale and Charlton Heston
 Muppet Treasure Island, a 1996 adaptation featuring the Muppets
Treasure Island (TV franchise), a reality television franchise that debuted in New Zealand in 1997 and has Australian and Irish editions 
 Treasure Island (1995 film), a film directed by Ken Russell
 Treasure Island (1999 film), a film featuring Kevin Zegers and Jack Palance
 Treasure Island (1999 independent film), a film by Scott King
Treasure Island (2012 TV series), a British adaptation broadcast on Sky1

Places

United States
 Treasure Island, San Francisco, California
 Treasure Island, Florida
 Treasure Island, Delaware River island and former home of Treasure Island Scout Reservation 
 Treasure Island, part of North Bay Village in Miami, Florida
 Reach Island, or Treasure Island, an island in Washington

Other places
 Treasure Island (Ontario), a small island in Lake Mindemoya, Ontario, Canada
 Zhenbao Island or Treasure Island, China, an island in the Ussuri River on the border with Russia
 Isla de la Juventud or Treasure Island, Cuba
 Treasure Island (Fiji), a coral island and resort that is part of the Mamanuca Islands
 Treasure Island, Singapore, an artificial island in Sentosa Cove

Music
Treasure Island (Keith Jarrett album), 1974
Treasure Island (Nick Harper album)
Treasure Island, an EP by Thomas Zwijsen
"Treasure Island", a 1977 instrumental by Bob James from BJ4
"Treasure Island", a 1989 song by Steven Curtis Chapman from More to This Life
"Treasure Island", a 1992 song by Running Wild from Pile of Skulls
"Treasure Island", a 2007 song by Brighten from King vs. Queen
"Treasure Island", a 2011 song by Iggy Azalea from Ignorant Art
"Treasure Island", a 2011 song by Charlotte OC
"Treasure Island", a 2017 song by Alestorm from No Grave But the Sea
"Treasure Island", a 2018 song by Azealia Banks

Other uses
Treasure Island (store), a former J. C. Penney store
Treasure Island (1981 video game), an arcade game
Treasure Island (1984 video game), a home computer game
Treasure Islands: Tax Havens and the Men Who Stole the World, 2011, by Nicholas Shaxson
Treasure Island Hotel and Casino, Las Vegas, Nevada, US
Treasure Island Media, gay pornography studio, San Francisco, US
Treasure Island Resort & Casino, Red Wing, Minnesota, US
Mt. Olympus Water & Theme Park or Treasure Island Resort, Wisconsin Dells, US
Treasure Island Foods, a chain of grocery stores in the Chicago area, US

See also
The Legends of Treasure Island, a British animated television series, based on the novel, that ran for two series between 1993 and 1995 on ITV
Treasure Island Dizzy, a 1988 computer game
Treasury Islands